Albin Alexander Provosty (July 17, 1865 – April 9, 1932) was a lawyer from New Roads, Louisiana, who represented Avoyelles and his native Pointe Coupee parishes in the Louisiana State Senate from 1912 to 1920 in what is now the geographically large District 17 covering all or parts of seven parishes. He was also a district attorney and for several years the publisher of The Pointe Coupee Banner. He lived in a classic home in New Roads with his wife, the former Marie Adele LeDoux (1870-1967).

References

1865 births
1932 deaths
People from New Roads, Louisiana
Democratic Party Louisiana state senators
District attorneys in Louisiana
American newspaper publishers (people)
Journalists from Louisiana